Clifford Watson is a former professional rugby league footballer who played in the 1960s and 1970s.

References

External links
Search for "Watson" at rugbyleagueproject.org
Search for "Clifford Watson" at britishnewspaperarchive.co.uk
Search for "Cliff Watson" at britishnewspaperarchive.co.uk

Hunslet F.C. (1883) players
Keighley Cougars players
Living people
Place of birth missing (living people)
Rugby league five-eighths
Year of birth missing (living people)